Ourania is a 2006 novel written in French by French Nobel laureate J. M. G. Le Clézio.

Plot summary
Le Clézio lived for fifteen years in a small village in Mexico called Valle de Bravo. Children invented an imaginary country and ideal, Ourania, and this book describes a near-Utopian society in Mexico. Two types of Utopias are compared to each other: a modest Utopia from the Jesuits and the other an ideal city called Santa Fe de la Laguna. The book mentions the transhumant movement Rainbows (1970–1980) and the Salvadoran revolution and its leader, Monsignor Romero. Failure was inevitable. Dreams are necessary, even if reality isn't.

Subject

Awards
The book won the “annual best foreign novels in 21st century” by the People’s Literature Publishing House (PLPH) January 28, 2007.

Publication history

References

Brief Introduction
Ourania originates from Greek mythology and first meant the muse of astronomy which was extended to the meaning of the heavenly world. This book describes a near-Utopian society in the name of Campos in Mexico. People here are vagrants from other corners of the world. All partners are equal regardless of age, social status and wealth class. Campos is a place which is abundant in the differences of nation, language, lifestyle and culture. Here, knowledge is used to forget. Camposers never study by books, they are just exposed to the world to feel freedom and truth. In contrast to the reality which is full of clash of civilizations, racial discrimination and language struggle, Campos is like real heaven's reflection on the ground. It is a utopian life state that is put by Le Clézio in the novel.

From scientists who fight for rights in the research laboratory to hookers and children who are oppressed, author told aggrievedly that in some corners of the world, there is no place for goodness and ugly lives live happily. The sentence “We don’t know both day and time” appears for four times in the novel and even be the title of the last chapter. Just as in the form of the echo, it speaks out people’s confusion at time. Just in this case, the novel shows an unknown ending for Campos. Under the leadership of new leader Odi, Camposers go to new lands and life which shows a strong faith to future. Although the real world is harsh and the future is unknown, people still keep hope for the life. Because as is known to all who had seen the brightness, the day is determined to break.

2007 French novels
Novels by J. M. G. Le Clézio
Novels set in Mexico
Works by J. M. G. Le Clézio
Éditions Gallimard books